Atractoscion is a genus of fish in the family Sciaenidae found in the Atlantic, Indian and Pacific Ocean. The genus is distinguished by having a lower jaw that protrudes beyond the upper jaw, shape and position of the swim bladder, the lack of barbels and sensory pores on the chin, teeth that are cardiform or pluriserial, and caudal fin that is slightly emarginate to lunate.

Species
There are currently 5 recognized species in this genus:
 Atractoscion aequidens (G. Cuvier, 1830) (Geel-beck croaker)
 Atractoscion atelodus (Günther, 1867) 
 Atractoscion macrolepis Y. S. Song, J. K. Kim, J. H. Kang & S. Y. Kim, 2017 
 Atractoscion microlepis Y. S. Song, J. K. Kim, J. H. Kang & S. Y. Kim, 2017 
 Atractoscion nobilis (Ayres, 1860) (White weakfish)

References

Sciaenidae
Taxa named by Theodore Gill
Ray-finned fish genera